Kottawa Dharmapala Maha Vidyalaya is a Buddhist school in Sri Lanka, which provides primary and secondary education. It was founded on 1 February 1970 in Kottawa.

History
In February 1970, the school was founded with 158 students, 5 teachers and one building, with a contribution from Parliament minister M.D.H Jayewardhana. The first principal was L. D. Premarathne.

Houses 
 - Mayura (මයුර)
 - Hansa (හංස)
 - Lihini (ලිහිණි)
 - Paravi (පරවි)

Sports
 Badminton
 Chess
 Taekwondo
 Judo
 Football
 Netball
 Volleyball
 Handball
 Athletics
 Karate
 Swimming
 Cadeting
 Scouting
 Cub Scouting
 Gymnastics

Notable alumni 
Kusal Janith Perera, Sri Lankan Cricketer
Dulani Chamika, Mechatronics Engineer

References

Buddhist schools in Sri Lanka
Schools in Colombo District